The 4th Royal Tank Regiment (4 RTR) was an armoured regiment of the British Army from its creation in 1917, during World War I, until 1993. It was part of the Royal Tank Regiment, itself part of the Royal Armoured Corps.

History

The regiment originally saw action as D Battalion, Tank Corps in 1917. In 1940, it was briefly amalgamated with the 7th Royal Tank Regiment, as the 4th/7th Royal Tank Regiment, returning to its previous title four months later.

4 RTR was captured at Tobruk on 21 June 1942. On 1 March 1945, 144th Regiment Royal Armoured Corps was redesignated 4th Royal Tank Regiment to replace the original. The newly retitled regiment equipped with Buffalo LVTs took part in Operation Plunder, ferrying troops of 51st Highland Division across the Rhine on the night of 23/24 March 1945. The Commanding Officer (Lt-Col Alan Jolly) carried the same standard that was originally carried across by 17th Armoured Car Battalion of the Royal Tank Corps in the First World War. Once again the RTR was first across the Rhine.

In 1948 it assisted in the ending of the British Mandate over Palestine. In 1959, it was again amalgamated with 7th Royal Tank Regiment, this time without a change of title, and in 1993 due to Options for Change, amalgamated with the 1st Royal Tank Regiment.

Commanding Officers

The Commanding Officers have been:
1960–1962: Lt.-Col. Thomas S. Craig
1962–1964: Lt.-Col. H. Brian C. Watkins
1964–1967: Lt.-Col. John A. Cowgill
1967–1969: Lt.-Col. Roger B.C. Plowden
1969–1971: Lt.-Col. Martin H. Sinnatt
1971–1973: Lt.-Col. Laurence A.W. New
1973–1976: Lt.-Col. David Sands
1976–1978: Lt.-Col. Nicholas H. Cocking
1978–1981: Lt.-Col. Michael J. Rose
1981–1983: Lt.-Col. Philip J. Sanders
1983–1985: Lt.-Col. Hedley D.C. Duncan
1985–1988: Lt.-Col. W. Douglas Cantley
1988–1990: Lt.-Col. Charles J. McBean
1990–1993: Lt.-Col. Martin N.E. Speller

Awards
Philip John Gardner – Victoria Cross Tobruk 1941

References

External links
 
 The History of the 4th and 7th Royal Tank Regiment. revised 2011
 The website of 4th RTR on the internet
 The History of the 4th and 7th Royal Tank Regiment
 Merseyside RTR (Brian Gills website)

Royal Tank Regiment
Royal Tank Regiment 004